Rex Mill in Jonesboro, Georgia is a grist mill that was listed on the National Register of Historic Places (NRHP) in 1979.

It was likely built sometime between 1820 and 1860 by I. L. ("Touch") Hollingsworth, who is known to have owned the mill in 1880.

It is believed to have always been painted red, except once briefly silver but repainted red due to outcry.

References

Grinding mills in Georgia (U.S. state)
National Register of Historic Places in Clayton County, Georgia